Poeciloneuron is a plant genus in the family Calophyllaceae. It contains a single species, Poeciloneuron indicum.

References

 
Monotypic Malpighiales genera